The SMERA is an ultracompact battery electric vehicle (BEV) concept car produced by Lumeneo. The concept car is a two-seater tilting car which tilts up to 25° in curves. With a length of 2500 mm and width of 960 mm (track 655 mm), it is something between an electric car and a scooter and includes a lithium ion battery pack. It is regulated in Europe as a car (classification M1). It made its debut at the 2008 Paris Motor Show. 

French railroad company SNCF invested €1.5 million in Lumeneo. The French railway reportedly injected capital into Green Cove Engineering, a provider of carpooling services.

A production version, the Lumeneo Neoma began sales in France in May 2013. After selling only 10 units Lumeneo filed for bankruptcy in November 2013.

References

External links 

Official Lumeneo website

Microcars
Quadricycles
Electric car models
Electric concept cars
Electric city cars
Cars introduced in 2008